Colors is the seventh studio album by German recording artist Max Mutzke. It was released by Columbia Records and Sony Music on 28 September 2018 in German-speaking Europe.

Track listing

Charts

Release history

References

2018 albums
Max Mutzke albums
Columbia Records albums